Brontopodus is an ichnogenus of dinosaur footprint. The footprint has diplodocid form, but four toes when almost every diplodocid has no more than three. This leaves Dyslocosaurus as the only known genus capable of producing the footprints. In 2020 Molina-Perez and Larramendi estimated the size of an individual at 23.7 meters (78 ft) and 32 tonnes (35.3 short tons) based on the 1.1 m (3.6 ft) long footprint that was found in Texas.

See also

 List of dinosaur ichnogenera

References

Dinosaur trace fossils